MycoBond is a low-energy material that is heat resistant and fire resistant and is biodegradable. Mycobond was discovered and developed by two Rensselaer Polytechnic Institute graduate students and National Science Foundation (NSF) assisted them in doing so.

MycoBond is created by using the natural growth process of the vegetative structure of a fungus called mycelium.

MycoBond is produced from crop waste such as seed husks (examples cited are oat, rice or buckweed husks, or cottonseed hulls), or woody biomass, that has been inoculated with a fungus (specifically mushroom).

Uses 
This material can be used as fire retardants, insulation, or packaging components.
In packaging applications, the end product has been tested and purportedly conforms with the specifications that are typical of a traditional petroleum polymer foam based cushioning/packing material (such as EPS).

Manufacturing 
To process the materials to be used as a feedstock to grow the structure, the feedstock material is cleaned, "cooked", cooled and pasteurized.  As part of the process the material is also continuously inoculated with mycelium (by spores or myclial division).  This processed and inoculated material is then placed in molds that conform to the shape and size of the final product.  As the mycelium grows, it consumes the feedstock and creates a chitinous polymer matrix that forms the lightweight, non-compressible structure.

It takes 5 days to grow packaging pieces, such as EcoCradle™ packaging blocks used to protect knock-down furniture pieces for shipment.

Benefits 

MycoBond is a completely biodegradable product that will not harm or poison the natural environment with petroleum byproducts such as benzene (a known carcinogen).

Additionally, MycoBond can be produced locally in virtually any region of the world.  The inventors have cultivated strains of mycelium that can use locally regionally sourced feedstocks.

References

Packaging materials